Felix is a Norwegian silent drama film from 1921.

The film is based on the story Keiser Felix by Gustav Aagaard. It was adapted into a screenplay by Gunnar Nilsen-Vig, who was also the film's cinematographer. Rasmus Breistein directed the film, and it was distributed by Kommunenes Filmcentral.

Plot
As autumn storms are blowing in over the island of Fagerøy, the priest's wife Else Margrete and her child die in childbirth. During the storm, a ship is also wrecked off the island, and the only survivor is a three-month-old boy. The maritime pilot Abraham takes the child to the rectory, and the young priest accepts the boy as a gift from heaven for the child he has lost. The boy is baptized Felix and grows up with the priest's daughter Signe. Abraham's son Thorleif is the children's best friend and playmate.

The years go by, and the children are confirmed. Signe has become a beautiful woman and Thorleif is in love with her. Felix also has feelings for her, but he lives in a dream world where Signe is his princess. When Signe tells Thorleif that she also has affections for him, Felix goes to sea to forget her. In Antwerp, he becomes seriously ill and lies waiting for death. He asks the priest at the Norwegian Church Abroad to write a letter to Signe. However, Felix recovers and goes home.

In the waters outside Fagerøy, a steamboat is surprised by a storm. On board the boat is Thorleif. Felix and the pilot Abraham go out with the pilot boat to try to rescue the steamer, but it sinks. Felix plunges into the water to rescue Thorleif and keeps him afloat while Abraham takes them aboard the boat. However, Felix dies from the effort, and Thorleif is taken home and is united with Signe.

Cast
 Aagot Børseth as Signe, the priest's daughter 
 Julian Strøm as Felix 
 Edvard Drabløs as Abraham, a maritime pilot
 Lars Tvinde as Carl Jensinius, the priest
 Guri Stormoen as the priest's wife
 Aasta Nielsen as Zazako, Felix's sister
 Nils Hald as Torleif, the pilot's son 
 Marie Flagstad as Aunt Malla 
 Eugen Skjønberg as the doctor
 Henny Skjønberg as a servant girl

References

External links
 
 Felix at the National Library of Norway

1921 films
Norwegian black-and-white films
Norwegian drama films
Norwegian silent films
1921 drama films
Films directed by Rasmus Breistein
Silent drama films